The lieutenant governor of Nova Scotia is the viceregal representative in Nova Scotia of the , who operates distinctly within the province but is also shared equally with the ten other jurisdictions of Canada, as well as the other Commonwealth realms and any subdivisions thereof, and resides predominantly in  oldest realm, the United Kingdom. The lieutenant governor of Nova Scotia is appointed in the same manner as the other provincial viceroys in Canada and is similarly tasked with carrying out most of the monarch's constitutional and ceremonial duties. The present, and 33rd lieutenant governor of Nova Scotia is Arthur Joseph LeBlanc, who has served in the role since 28 June 2017.

Role and presence

The lieutenant governor of Nova Scotia is vested with a number of governmental duties and is also expected to undertake various ceremonial roles. For instance, the lieutenant governor acts as patron, honorary president, or an honorary member of certain Nova Scotia institutions, such as the Multicultural Association of Nova Scotia, the Nova Scotia Salmon Association, and the Royal Canadian Legion (Nova Scotia-Nunavut Command). Also, The viceroy, him or herself a member and Chancellor of the order, will induct deserving individuals into the Order of Nova Scotia and, upon installation, automatically becomes a Knight or Dame of Justice and the Vice-Prior in Nova Scotia of the Most Venerable Order of the Hospital of Saint John of Jerusalem. The viceroy further presents numerous other provincial honours and decorations, as well as various awards that are named for and presented by the lieutenant governor; these are generally created in partnership with another government or charitable organization and linked specifically to their cause. These honours are presented at official ceremonies, which count amongst hundreds of other engagements the lieutenant governor partakes in each year, either as host or guest of honour; the lieutenant governor in 2006 undertook 289 engagements and 384 in 2007.

At these events, the lieutenant governor's presence is marked by the lieutenant governor's standard, consisting, unlike most other viceregal flags in Canada, of the Royal Union Flag defaced with the escutcheon of the Arms of  Majesty in Right of Nova Scotia surrounded by a circle of 18 green maple leaves. This is the last of the Canadian governors' flags to retain the original design set out by Queen Victoria in 1869, though for a period in the 1950s, the lieutenant governor used a flag bearing simply the arms of the province. Within Nova Scotia, the lieutenant governor also follows only the sovereign in the province's order of precedence, preceding even other members of the Canadian Royal Family and the King's federal representative.

The aides-de-camp who serve the lieutenant governor wear on their uniforms a badge consisting of the flag of the lieutenant governor in the form of a shield surmounted by a St. Edward's Crown. The Canadian Heraldic Authority designed the badge, with the authorisation on 20 May 2011 of Governor General David Johnston, as well as of Queen Elizabeth II for the use of the royal crown.

History

The office of lieutenant governor of Nova Scotia came into being in 1786, when the government of William Pitt adopted the idea that Nova Scotia, along with New Brunswick, Quebec, and Prince Edward Island, should have as their respective governors a single individual. The earlier post of governor of Nova Scotia thus came to be occupied by the overreaching authority of the governor-in-chief, who was represented in the colony by a lieutenant. The modern incarnation of the office, however, was established in 1867, upon Nova Scotia's entry into Confederation. Since that date, 30 lieutenant governors have served the province among whom were notable firsts, such as Myra Freeman, the first female lieutenant governor of the province, and Mayann Francis, the first lieutenant governor of Black Nova Scotian ancestry. The shortest mandate by a Lieutenant Governor of Nova Scotia was Joseph Howe, for three weeks in July 1873, and the longest was Malachy Bowes Daly, from 1890 to 1900.

See also
 Monarchy in the Canadian provinces
 Government of Nova Scotia
 Lieutenant Governors of Canada

References

Further reading

External links

 Lieutenant Governor of Nova Scotia

 
Nova Scotia